Elizabeth Ann Louisa Mackay (née Budge, 23 January 1843 – 24 August 1908) was a New Zealand farmer, feminist, community leader and inventor. She was born in Godmanchester, Huntingdonshire, England on 23 January 1843.

She died in Nelson, New Zealand in 1908 and was buried in Wakapuaka Cemetery.

References

1843 births
1908 deaths
New Zealand farmers
New Zealand women farmers
New Zealand feminists
New Zealand inventors
People from Godmanchester
English emigrants to New Zealand
Burials at Wakapuaka Cemetery
Women inventors
19th-century New Zealand people